Corruption levels are perceived to be high by surveyed residents of Serbia, and public trust in key institutions remains low.

Dynamics 
Public procurement, public administration recruitment processes, mining and rail operations are sectors with a serious problem of conflict of interest. The European Commission has raised concern over Serbia's judiciary, police, health and education sectors that are particularly vulnerable to corruption. Corruption is considered the most problematic factor for doing business in Serbia, followed by inefficient government bureaucracy.

Anti-corruption efforts 
Even though Serbia has made progress in the investigation of high-level corruption cases, the implementation of anti-corruption laws is weak. According to Global Corruption Barometer 2016, 22% of Serbian citizens who had contact with public institutions included in research (traffic police, public health, educational system, courts - civil litigation, public services that issue official documents, departments responsible for social welfare), had paid bribe at least once in the previous year.

Transparency International's 2021 Corruption Perceptions Index scored Serbia at 38 on a scale from 0 ("highly corrupt") to 100 ("highly clean"). When ranked by score, Serbia ranked 96th among the 180 countries in the Index, where the country ranked first is perceived to have the most honest public sector.  For comparison, the best score was 88 (ranked 1), and the worst score was 11 (ranked 180). Transparency Serbia concluded at the presentation of the 2015 Index that systemic measures for preventing corruption had not been implemented and activities to suppress corruption, although highly publicized by the media, had not resulted in court proceedings.

See also 
 Crime in Serbia

References

External links
Serbia Corruption Profile from the Business Anti-Corruption Portal

Crime in Serbia by type
Government of Serbia
Society of Serbia
Serbia